Steve Byers (born December 31, 1974) is a Canadian actor, best known for his roles on Falcon Beach and Slasher.

Early life
Byers was born in Scarborough, Ontario on December 31, 1979. He graduated 1993, with the top award for Excellence in Drama from the Arts program at Unionville High School and enrolled in the University of Western Ontario's Film Program.

Career
Among Byers' first professional roles were guest parts on La Femme Nikita and A Simple Wish. He moved to Vancouver and took a recurring role on MTV's comedy series 2gether, then Byers returned to his home town of Toronto to appear with Rachel McAdams in MTV's Shotgun Love Dolls. Byers has since worked on many network television series including Kevin Hill, Glory Days, and the Dresden Files. One of Byers' most notable roles is Jason Tanner on TV show Falcon Beach. Byers appeared in Left for Dead with Danielle Harris, and in the film My Daughter's Secret.

In January 2009 he acted in CBC's short-lived drama  Wild Roses as Will McGregor. He guest-starred in the eighth, fourteenth, and last episode of the tenth and final season of Smallville, playing Desaad, one of Darkseid's minions. He played Heracles in Tarsem Singh's fantasy epic Immortals. He also appeared in Lifetime's series Against The Wall as Officer Steve Kowalski and in Alphas as John Bennett. He had a lead role in Catch a Christmas Star, a 2013 Hallmark movie and  a supporting role in Gridlocked.  In 2016, Byers played the leading role of Cam Henry in the television series Slasher.

Personal life
Byers is married to actress Jennifer Steede, and has two children. Byers comes from an Irish background.

Filmography

Film

Television

Video games

Awards and nominations

References

External links
 

1979 births
Male actors from Toronto
Canadian male film actors
Canadian male television actors
Canadian male voice actors
Living people
People from Scarborough, Toronto
University of Western Ontario alumni